Wey may refer to:

Places
Wey (state) (衞), or Wei, ancient Chinese state during the Zhou Dynasty
River Wey, river in Surrey, Hampshire and West Sussex, England
River Wey (Dorset), river of Dorset, south west England
Wey and Arun Canal,  canal in the south of England
Wey and Godalming Navigations, navigable parts of the River Wey, in Surrey, England

People
Joseph Edet Akinwale Wey (died 1990), Nigerian naval officer
Thomas Wey, English politician
Van Van Wey (1924–1991), American racing driver
Wey Daw-ming (1899–1978), Chinese diplomat

Measurements
Wey (unit), historical unit of mass/weight and volume

Companies
 WEY, a Chinese luxury SUV manufacturer and subsidiary company of Great Wall Motors

Transport
 Weymouth railway station, Dorset, England (National Rail station code)

See also
 Whey (disambiguation)
 Wei (disambiguation)
 Way (disambiguation)